Petra Prokoppne Teveli (born 1 November 1979 in Siófok) is a Hungarian marathon runner. In 2008, she set her personal best time of 2:35:21 by finishing fifth in the Turin Marathon.

Teveli represented Hungary at the 2008 Summer Olympics in Beijing, where she competed for the women's marathon. She finished the race in sixty-fifth place by just a minute ahead of Rwanda's Epiphanie Nyirabarame, with a time of 2:48:32.

References

External links

NBC 2008 Olympics profile

Hungarian female marathon runners
Living people
Olympic athletes of Hungary
Athletes (track and field) at the 2008 Summer Olympics
People from Siófok
1979 births
Sportspeople from Somogy County